{{DISPLAYTITLE:C4H9NO3}}
The molecular formula C4H9NO3 may refer to:

 γ-Amino-β-hydroxybutyric acid
 Butyl nitrate
 Homoserine
 Threonine

Molecular formulas